The Cham Albanian dialect, also called Cham Tosk or Arvanitika , is the dialect of the Albanian language spoken by the Cham Albanians, an ethnic Albanian minority in the Epirus region of northwestern Greece and in Konispol, southern Albania.

Features
Cham Albanian is part of Tosk Albanian and is the second-southernmost variety of Albanian language, the other being Arvanitika, which is also part of Tosk Albanian. As such, Arvanitika and Cham dialect retain a number of common features. It also thus closely related to Arbëresh and Lab.  

The dialect has been affected by language contact from the nearby Greek dialects much more compared to any other adjacent Albanian dialect.

Linguistic conservatism
Linguists say the Cham dialect has a conservative character, which is due to the close proximity and its continuous contacts with the Greek language. They argue that this conservative character, which is reflected in a number of peculiar features of the dialect, is endangered, as are the Albanian toponyms of the region, which are no longer in use, and which have provided valuable material for research into the historical evolution of Albanian.

Phonology
Like Arvanitika in southern Greece and Arbëresh in Italy, Cham Albanian retains some conservative features of Albanian, such as the old consonant clusters /kl/, /gl/, which in standard Albanian are q and gj, and retention of /l/ instead of /j/.

Like Lab, Arbëresh language, and also the Gheg dialects of Debar and Ulqin, Cham unrounds Albanian /y/ to /i/. It also fronts the Albanian schwa ë, and merges it with e -- this is the opposite of certain Lab dialects, which tend to back the schwa into /ʌ/ (as in English "nut").

Morphology and Syntax
The declensions of verbs and nouns may vary in Cham Albanian:
 the present perfect may be done differently for reflexive verbs, and it resembles the imperfect: u kam bërë instead of jam bërë. 
 due to the preservation of intervocalic l, the -je morpheme of some verbal nouns is instead -ele, so marrje may be pronounced (archaically) as marrele
 the -eshe ending is also replaced with -ele

Written sources

The first Albanian-language book written in the region of Chameria was the Greek-Albanian dictionary by Markos Botsaris, a Souliote captain and prominent figure of the Greek War of Independence. This dictionary was the biggest Cham Albanian dictionary of its time, with 1,484 lexemes. According to albanologist Robert Elsie, it is not of any particular literary significance, but is important for our knowledge of the now extinct Suliot-Albanian dialect, a sub-branch of the Cham dialect. The dictionary is preserved at the Bibliothèque Nationale in Paris.

During the 19th century, Chams started creating bejtes, which were a new kind of poems, mainly in Southern Albania. The most well-known bejtexhi was Muhamet Kyçyku (Çami), born in Konispol. He is the only poet in Albania that has written in the Cham dialect and was apparently also the first Albanian author to have written longer poetry. The work for which he is best remembered is a romantic tale in verse form known as Erveheja (Ervehe), originally entitled Ravda ("Garden"), written about 1820. Kyçyku is the first poet of the Albanian National Renaissance.

Historical background 
Albanians in the region of Epirus are attested in historical sources since the beginning of the 13th century. A Venetian document (1210) mentions that "the continent facing the island of Corfu is inhabited by Albanians" and a letter from John Apokaukos, Metropolitan of Naupaktos, to a George Dysipati (ancestor of the Shpata family).<ref>{{cite journal|last=Giakoumis |first=Konstantinos |year=2003 |url= https://www.researchgate.net/publication/233673710 |title=Fourteenth-century Albanian migration and the 'relative autochthony' of the Albanians in Epeiros. The case of Gjirokastër |journal=Byzantine and Modern Greek Studies |volume=27 |issue=1 |page=176|doi=10.1179/byz.2003.27.1.171 |quote=The presence of Albanians in the Epeirote lands from the beginning of the thirteenth century is also attested by two documentary sources: the first is a Venetian document of 1210, which states that the continent facing the island of Corfu is inhabited by Albanians;" and the second is letters of the Metropolitan of Naupaktos John Apokaukos to a certain George Dysipati, who was considered to be an ancestor of the famous Shpata family. Furthermore, I suggest that names that appear in two acts of the Angevins of Naples dated 130422 using the forms, Albos, Spatos, Catarucos, Bischesini, Aranitos, Lecenis, Turbaceos, Marchaseos, Scuras, Zeneuias, Bucceseos, Logoresc and Mateseos are either well-known, less-known or totally unknown names of Albanian clan leaders at that time. Are we obliged to see in this a possible earlier Albanian immigration in the Epeirote lands, as Kostas Komis did in the case of the etymology of the toponym Preveza'?" I believe that the use of hypothetical immigrations as a basis to interpret sources that indicate the presence of Albanians in the Epeirote lands prior to the thirteenth-fourteenth century is somewhat arbitrary. For it serves the concept of national purity in zones with clear lines of communication, mutual relations (as linguistic research has proved) and common traditions, religion as well as principal language of communication. It is evident that this was the case in a period when co-existence and understanding among people of different nations (in the modern sense of the term) were far better than they are today.}}</ref> Albanian tribes moved to the south in large numbers in the early 14th century and established territories like the Despotate of Arta.

History
Cham is believed to have separated from Lab, Arvanite, and Arbereshe some time in the late Middle Ages. 

During much of the Ottoman period, most of the writing in Chameria was done in Greek or in Turkish, and Cham Albanian was a spoken dialect only, while Albanians found it difficult to find education in their native language. Christian Albanians could attend Greek schools, and Muslim Albanians Turkish schools, but Albanian language schools were highly discouraged. Nationalist sentiments during the late Ottoman era was weak in the region with Muslim Albanian Chams referring to themselves as Myslyman(Muslims) or Turks while local Orthodox Albanian speaking Christians referred to themselves as Kaur (i.e infidels) and did not find the term offensive. During the Albanian National Awakening a number of local Albanians would establish private, unrecognized Albanian-language schools. In 1870, the despot of Paramythia, Grygorios, translated the New Testament into Albanian, as his followers could not understand well the Greek language. While, in 1879, the first Albanian school of the region was created in Sagiada by father Stathi Melani. At that time, the region was under the short-lived rule of the League of Prizren. 

The Expulsion of Cham Albanians in the aftermath of World War II was a traumatic event that put pressure on the Cham dialect, and ultimately in both Greece and Albania, Chams were pressured to give up their dialect in favor of Standard Greek and Standard Albanian respectively.

Sociolinguistics and survival
Where Chams are concentrated in Modern Albania, the dialect may still be strong especially in the elder generations, although it is increasingly influenced by Standard Albanian. Konispol and Markat are two traditionally Cham speaking municipalities that lie within the borders of Albania, and thus did not experience the expulsion.   

In Greece, meanwhile, Cham Albanian may be upheld by the Orthodox Cham Albanian communities that were not expelled. According to a study by the Euromosaic project of the European Union, Albanian speaking communities live along the border with Albania in Thesprotia prefecture, the northern part of the Preveza prefecture in the region called Thesprotiko, and a few villages in Ioannina regional unit. The Arvanite dialect is still spoken by a minority of inhabitants in Igoumenitsa. In northern Preveza prefecture, those communities also include the region of Fanari, in villages such as Ammoudia and Agia. In 1978, some of the older inhabitants in these communities were Albanian monolinguals. The language is spoken by young people too, because when the local working-age population migrate seeking a job in Athens, or abroad, the children are left with their grandparents, thus creating a continuity of speakers.

Today, these Orthodox Albanian speaking communities refer to themselves as Arvanites in the Greek language and their language as Arvanitika but they call it Shqip while speaking Albanian.Tsitsipis. Language change and language death. 1981. p. 2. "The term Shqip is generally used to refer to the language spoken in Albania. Shqip also appears in the speech of the few monolinguals in certain regions of Greek Epirus, north-western Greece, while the majority of the bilingual population in the Epirotic enclaves use the term Arvanitika to refer to the language when talking in Greek, and Shqip when talking in Albanian (see Çabej 1976:61-69, and Hamp 1972: 1626-1627 for the etymological observations and further references)." In contrast with the Arvanites, some have retained a distinct linguistic  and ethnic identity. In the presence of foreigners there is a stronger reluctance amongst Orthodox Albanian speakers to speak Albanian, compared to the Arvanites in other parts of Greece. A reluctance has been also noticed for those who still see themselves as Chams to declare themselves as such. Researchers like Tom Winnifirth on short stays in the area have hence found it difficult to find Albanian speakers in urban areas and concluded in later years that Albanian had "virtually disappeared" in the region. According to Ethnologue'', the Albanian speaking population of Greek Epirus and Greek Western Macedonia number 10,000 as of 2002. According to Miranda Vickers in 1999, Orthodox Chams today are approximately 40,000.

See also
Cham Albanians
Souliotes
Tosk Albanian
Arvanitika

Notes

References

Albanian dialects